Ruth Madoc (born Margaret Ruth Llewellyn Baker; 16 April 1943 – 9 December 2022) was a British actress who had a career on stage and screen spanning over 60 years. She was best known for her role as Gladys Pugh in the BBC television comedy Hi-de-Hi! (1980–1988), for which she received a BAFTA TV award nomination for Best Light Entertainment Performance.

Early life
Madoc was born Margaret Ruth Llewellyn Baker on 16 April 1943 in Norwich, daughter of George Baker and Iris (née Williams), who worked in healthcare, her father as an administrator and her mother as a nurse. They ran a "poor law" institution for people with severe learning difficulties. On her father's side she was a distant cousin of British Prime Minister David Lloyd George; having starred in The Life and Times of David Lloyd George in 1981, she learned of this connection in 2010 on the BBC Wales programme Coming Home. Her parents travelled around Britain for much of her childhood, and she was brought up by her Welsh grandmother Etta Williams and her English grandfather at Llansamlet in Swansea. She later trained at the Royal Academy of Dramatic Art (RADA) in London.

In 1971, Madoc played Fruma Sarah in the film version of the musical Fiddler on the Roof, and in 1972 she appeared as Mrs Dai Bread Two in the film version of Under Milk Wood. She also appeared regularly in the entertainment programme Poems and Pints on BBC Wales. She provided one of the alien voices in the Cadbury's Smash commercials in the 1970s, and made a brief appearance in the 1977 film The Prince and the Pauper (aka Crossed Swords).

Madoc appeared in many theatre productions, including the stage version of Under Milk Wood, Steel Magnolias, Agatha Christie thrillers (And Then There Were None), the musical Annie, and many pantomime parts. She appeared twice at the Royal Variety Performance, once in 1982 and again in 1986.

Madoc was best known for her portrayal of Gladys Pugh, one of the lead roles in the television sitcom Hi-de-Hi, for which she received a BAFTA TV award nomination for Best Light Entertainment Performance. The comedy was set in the fictional 1950s-type holiday camp Maplins. Madoc's recurring role centred on her unrequited love for the camp entertainment manager Professor Jeffrey Fairbrother (Simon Cadell) and she was notable for her announcements on the camp tannoy with her signature three notes played on a mini xylophone.

In 1984, Madoc was the subject of This Is Your Life when she was surprised by Eamonn Andrews. In 1993 she played Mrs Bardell in Pickwick at the Chichester Festival Theatre. In 2004 she appeared in the reality television programme Cariad@Iaith on S4C, in which celebrities went on an intensive course in the Welsh language. She also appeared in the fourth series of LivingTV reality show I'm Famous and Frightened! which she went on to win. In 2005 she appeared as Daffyd Thomas's mother in the second series of BBC sketch show Little Britain.

She also appeared in "Annie" as Miss Hannigan on tour. In 2007 she appeared as a fictional version of herself in episode 2 of the BBC Radio 2 comedy Buy Me Up TV. In 2008 she appeared at the Pavilion Theatre in Rhyl, playing the Bad Fairy in the pantomime 'Sleeping Beauty', with Sonia and Rebecca Trehearn.

Madoc returned to situation comedy in 2009 and appeared in Big Top on BBC1, alongside Amanda Holden, John Thomson and Tony Robinson.

In 2010, Madoc investigated her family history for the BBC Wales programme Coming Home and learned that she was related to David Lloyd George.

In January 2015, Madoc appeared as the Fairy Godmother in the pantomime Cinderella at the Palace Theatre, Mansfield. In September 2019 she re-joined the cast in the autumn tour of Calendar Girls The Musical after recovering from an injury earlier in the year; the show opened at Bournemouth Pavilion on 17 September and ended on 23 November at Chichester Festival Theatre.

Madoc was awarded an honorary degree by Swansea University in July 2006.

Personal life and death
Madoc's first husband was the actor Philip Madoc, with whom she appeared in the 1981 TV serial The Life and Times of David Lloyd George. They had a son, Rhys, and a daughter, Lowri, and were married for twenty years, but divorced in 1981.

In 1982, she married her second husband, John Jackson, with whom she bought a home in Glynneath in 2002. They were married until his death in September 2021.

In December 2022, Madoc was set to appear in the pantomime Aladdin at the Princess Theatre, Torquay. However, on 8 December, a statement posted to Madoc's Instagram account confirmed she had suffered a fall earlier in the week and was unable to appear in the production. After undergoing surgery, Madoc died the following day, 9 December, in hospital, at the age of 79.

Filmography

Television

Films

References

External links

Official website
 

1943 births
2022 deaths
Accidental deaths from falls
Actors from Norwich
Actresses from Swansea
Alumni of RADA
British stage actresses
British television actresses
Reality show winners
20th-century British actresses
21st-century British actresses
Place of death missing